An A-Z list of films produced in the State of Palestine, the Palestinian Authority and by Palestinians - either under Israeli Civil Administration and Israeli-occupied West Bank and Gaza Strip.

Numbers
3cm Less a.k.a. Ghost Hunting (2003), documentary. 60 minutes, dir: Azza EL-Hassan
3000 Nights (2015)
5 Broken Cameras (2011)
200 Meters (2020), dir: Ameen Nayfeh.

A
Ajami (2009)
Al Dhakira al Khasba (1980)
Al qods fee yom akhar (2002)
Always Look Them In The Eyes (2007), documentary, 50 minutes, dir: Azza EL-Hassan 
Amreeka (2009)
Apples of the Golan (2012)
Arba'a aghani li Filasteen (2001)
Arna's Children  (2003)
Around (2006)
Atash (2004) 
Attente (2005)

B
Back to One's Roots (2013)
Because Roots Don't Die (1977), Nabiha Lutfi
Before You Were Born (2011), documentary, 50 minutes. dir: Azza EL-Hassan 
Budrus (2009)

C
Cantique des pierres, Le (1990)
Chronicle of a Disappearance (1996)
The Color of Olives (2006) 
Cut (2000)

D
Divine Intervention (2002)
Duma (2011)
Don't Cry (Short Animation) (2022 )

E
Ejteyah (2003)
Eye Drops (2013), short film

F
Farha (2013)
Fatena (2013), 3D animated
Fatenah (2009), 3D animated film about breast cancer taboo
First Lesson (2013), short film
First Picture (2006)
Five Minutes From Home (2008), documentary, 52 min, dir: Nahed Awwad
Fix (2004)
Fix Me (2013), documentary
Flying Paper (2012), documentary
Forbidden Marriages in the Holy Land (1995) 
Ford Transit (2002) 
The Fourth Room (2005), Short documentary, 25 minutes, dir: Nahed Awwad
Frontiers of Dreams and Fears (2001)

G
Gaza Calling (2012) 65 min, documentary, dir: Nahed Awwad 
Gaza-London (2010)
Gaza mon amour (2020)
Ghost Hunting (2017)
The Great Liberation (2010)
The Great Book Robbery (2012)

H
Haifa (1996) 
Haneen (2013), short film
Hasan Everywhere (2013), short animated film
Hatta Ishaar Akhar (1994)
Heart of Jenin (2009) 
Hikayatul jawahiri thalath (1995)

I
The Idol (2015)
In Fair Palestine: a story of Romeo and Juliet (2008)
In Search of a Death Fortold (2004), video art, dir: Azza EL-Hassan
In Working Progress (2006) 
Incha'Allah (2012)
The Inner Tour (2001) 
Insomnie (2005)
Internacionales en Palestina (2005)
Into The Belly of The Whale (2010) 
The Iron Wall (2006)

J
Jenin, Jenin (2002)
Jeremy Hardy vs. the Israeli Army (2003) 
Jerusalem: An Occupation Set in Stone? (1994)
Jerusalem, The East Side Story (2008)
Jerusalem's High Cost of Living (2000)
Just Another Day (2009)
Junction 48 (2016)

K
Kings & Extras a.k.a. Exposed & Lost (2004), documentary, 62 minutes, dir: Azza EL-Hassan

L
Laila's Birthday (2008) 
The Land Speaks Arabic (2007), documentary
Last Days In Jerusalem (2013)
Last Supper: Abu Dis (2005)
The Law in the Parts (2011)
Lemon Tree (2009)
Like Twenty Impossibles (2003)
Love During Wartime (2013), documentary
Love, Theft and Other Entanglements (2015)
Little Town of Bethlehem (2010)

M
Man Without A Cellphone (2013)
Miral (2010)
My Neighborhood (2013), documentary, co-directed by Julia Bacha and Rebekah Wingert-Jabi

N
Na'im wa Wadee'a (1999)
Nana (1997)
Nazareth 2000 (2000)
News Time (2001), documentary, 52 minutes, dir: Azza EL-Hassan
No Child Is Born A Terrorist (2008), short film
No News (2013), short film
Number One On The List (2013), documentary

O
Obor kalandia (2002)
Occupied Palestine (1981), rare
The Olive Harvest (2003)
Omar (2013)
Ostura (1998)
Out of cigarettes (2005)

P
Palestine in the Eye (1976)
Palestine Stereo (2013)
Paradise Now (2005) 
Ping Pong Revenge (2005)
The Place (2000), video Art, dir: Azza EL-Hassan
Pomegranates and Myrrh (2008)
A Post Oslo History (1998)
The Present (2021), short film
Private (2004)

R
Rana's Wedding (2002) 
Replay Revenge (2005)
Rico in the Night (2007)

S
Safar (2003)
Salt of this Sea (2008)
The Satellite Shooters (2001)
The Shooter (2013), short film
Sinbad is a She (2002), 30 minutes, dir: Azza EL-Hassan
Slingshot Hip Hop (2008)
The Sons of Eilaboun (2007)
Stress (1998/I)

T
Tahaddi (2001)
The Tale of the Three Lost Jewels (1994)
Tears of Gaza (2009), documentary
They Don't Exist (1974), rare
Thyme Goes On (2001)
 (2002), dir: Rashid Masharawi
The Time That Remains (2009)
Title Deed From Moses (1999), documentary, 30 minutes, dir: Azza EL-Hassan
Traces dans le rocher du lointain (2000)
Trafic (2006)
Two Meters Of This Land (2012)

U
The Unbearable Presence of Asmahan (2014), 80 min, dir: Azza EL-Hassan

V
The View (2008)
Villa Touma (2014)

W
Waiting (2005)
Wedding in Galilee (1987)
When I Saw You (2012)
Where Should The Birds Fly? (2013)
Why? (2007)

Y
Yadon ilaheyya (2002) 
Yala to The Moon (2013), short film
Yasmine (1996) 
Yasmine's Song (2005) 
Yomanei Shalom (1994) 
You, Me, Jerusalem (1995)

Z
Zaytoun (2012)
Ziena (2004)

References

External links 
 A chronology of Palestinian cinema (1927-1999) and (2000-2012)

Palestinian films

Films